Marcela Miriam Losardo (born 24 August 1958) is an Argentine lawyer and politician. She served as the country's Minister of Justice and Human Rights from 10 December 2019 to 29 March 2021, in the cabinet of President Alberto Fernández. In 2021, she was appointed as Argentina's representative to UNESCO.

Early life and education
Losardo was born in Buenos Aires in 1958. She played tennis in high school and attended the Lenguas Vivas school system. She studied law at the University of Buenos Aires School of Law, where she met future Argentine president Alberto Fernández, with whom she would later set up a bureau.

Political career
Losardo worked alongside Alberto Fernández in the insurance superintendency from 1989 to 1996; from then on she worked in his staff during his term in the Buenos Aires City Legislature from 2003 to 2005.

In 2005 she was appointed Secretary of Justice, working under the successive administrations of justice ministers Horacio Rosatti, Alberto Iribarne, Aníbal Fernández and Julio Alak. In 2006 she served as the Executive Power's representative to the Council of Magistracy. She left the secretariat in 2009 at the behest of Alak; her successor was Héctor Masquelet.

Minister of Justice and Human Rights
On 6 December 2019 it was announced Losardo was going to be the new Minister of Justice and Human Rights in the incoming cabinet of President Alberto Fernández, succeeding Germán Garavano. She assumed office alongside the rest of the new cabinet on 10 December 2019.

As justice minister, Losardo has spearheaded the Fernández government's proposed reform of the justice system. The reform project is currently being debated in the Argentine Senate.

In March 2021, Losardo announced she was stepping down as Minister. She was succeeded by Martín Soria on 29 March 2021.

Personal life
Losardo is married to Fernando Mitjans, a scrivener whom she met while studying in university. Losardo and Mitjans have a daughter, Clara, who is also a lawyer.

References

External links

Official website of the Ministry of Justice and Human Rights (in Spanish)

1958 births
Living people
21st-century Argentine women politicians
21st-century Argentine politicians
20th-century Argentine lawyers
Female justice ministers
Members of the Argentine Council of Magistracy
Ministers of Justice of Argentina
Lawyers from Buenos Aires
University of Buenos Aires alumni
Women government ministers of Argentina
Permanent Delegates of Argentina to UNESCO